The following is a list of revolving restaurants. A revolving restaurant is usually a tower restaurant designed to rest atop a broad circular revolving platform that operates as a large turntable. The building remains stationary and the diners are carried on the revolving floor.

Albania
Sky Club Panoramic Bar & Restaurant, Sky Tower, Tirana
Dajti Tower Belvedere Hotel, Dajti, Tirana
Bar Zodiak, Shkodër

Argentina
Confiteria Giratoria, San Carlos de Bariloche

Australia

Australian Capital Territory
Alto Tower Restaurant, Black Mountain Tower, Canberra (closed in 2013)
New South Wales
360 Bar and Dining, Sydney Tower, Sydney
Cucina Locale Revolving Restaurant, Blacktown
Skyway Restaurant, Katoomba Scenic World, Katoomba (ceased revolving in 2012, however can be rotated during private events on request)
O Bar Restaurant, Australia Square, Sydney

Queensland
Four Winds Revolving Restaurant, Crowne Plaza, Surfers Paradise
South Australia
Top of the World Revolving Restaurant, Atlantic Tower, Glenelg (closed in 2014)
Tasmania
Point Revolving Restaurant, Wrest Point Hotel Casino, Sandy Bay
Western Australia
C Restaurant, St Martins Tower, Perth
Koala's View Revolving Restaurant, Bedfordale

Austria
Donauturm, Vienna

Azerbaijan
Hilton Hotel, Baku

Bangladesh
Top of the World Restaurant, Shaheed Zia Smriti Complex, Chandgaon Thana, Chittagong
Mainland China, Siam Tower, Uttara Model Town, Dhaka

Bolivia
Restaurante Giratorio Pari Urqu, Potosí

Bosnia and Herzegovina
Radon Plaza, Sarajevo; designed by Mr.sci. Dzavid Begovic (+387 61 224084), Energoinvest-TMP d.o.o.,built in 2004.; the first revolving restaurant in Balcan.

Brazil
Cuisine Du Ciel, Golden Tulip Internacional Foz, Foz do Iguaçu
(Permanently closed)
Restaurante Platô, Torre Quixadá, Fortaleza (closed c.2005)
Revolving Mascaron Restaurant, Torre Mirante da Serra, Veranópolis
Revolving Rooftop Restaurant, Taj Mahal Continental Hotel, Manaus
Lassú, K1 Building São Paulo

Bulgaria
Magnito Sky, Varna Towers, Varna

Cambodia
The Penthouse Residence, Cheval Blanc Restaurant, Celeste Sky Bar Phnom Penh

Canada

Alberta
La Ronde, Chateau Lacombe Hotel, Edmonton
Sky 360 Restaurant, Calgary Tower, Calgary

British Columbia

Cloud 9 Revolving Restaurant & Lounge, Empire Landmark Hotel, Vancouver (closed in 2017; building demolished 2018–2019)
Top of Vancouver Revolving Restaurant, Harbour Centre, Vancouver
Vistas Revolving Restaurant & Bar, Pinnacle Hotel Harbourfront, Vancouver (closed, now private convention space)

Manitoba
Prairie 360, Fort Garry Place, Winnipeg

Ontario
360 Restaurant (Top of Toronto 1975–1995), CN Tower, Toronto
Skylon Tower, Niagara Falls
Summit, Ottawa Marriott Hotel, Ottawa (restaurant closed, currently a revolving event room)
Toulà (formerly Lighthouse), Westin Harbour Castle Hotel, Toronto (ceased revolving in 2001)
La Ronde, Holiday Inn  Downtown 89 Chesnut (now Chestnut Residence and restaurant on southwest corner closed now used as non-revolving student lounge The Lookout)

Quebec
 Ciel! Bistro-Bar, Hotel le Concorde, Quebec City
 Portus 360, Plaza Centre-Ville, Montreal

Chile
Coco-Loco, Valparaíso
Giratorio, Santiago

China

Beijing
Carousel Revolving Restaurant, Xiyuan Hotel, Beijing
Revolving Restaurant, China Central Television Tower, Beijing
Starlight Revolving Restaurant, Beijing International Hotel, Beijing 
Summit Club Restaurant and Lounge, Hotel Kunlun, Beijing

Chengdu
Restaurant Grande, West Pearl Tower, Chengdu

Chongqing
Jiuchongtian (Cloud 9) Revolving Restaurant, Yu Du Hotel {Jiefangbei CBD}, Chongqing

Dalian
Mingzhu Revolving Restaurant, Bohai Grand Hotel, Dalian
Revolving Restaurant, Bohai Pearl Hotel, Dalian
Revolving Restaurant, Dalian Radio and TV Tower, Dalian

Guangdong Province
Guangzhou
Carousel Restaurant, Garden Hotel, Guangzhou
Revolving Restaurant, Aiqun Hotel, Guangzhou
Sky Cafe-Revolving Restaurant, Guangdong Asia International Hotel, Guangzhou
Shenzhen
Guomao Revolving Restaurant, Shenzhen International Trade Center, Shenzhen
Sky Paradise, Panglin Hotel, Shenzhen
Tiara, Shangri La Hotel, Shenzhen
Phoenix Court Restaurant, Baolilai International Hotel, Shenzhen
Zhaoqing
Revolving Restaurant, Pearl Hotel Starlake, Zhaoqing
Zhongshan
City-view Revolving Restaurant, Fuhua Hotel, Zhongshan

Hangzhou
J Western Restaurant, Tianyuan Tower Hotel, Hangzhou
Restaurant Café and Bar, Friendship Hotel, Hangzhou

Shanghai
Art 50, Hotel Novotel Shanghai Atlantis, Shanghai
Blue Heaven Revolving Restaurant, Jin Jiang Tower, Shanghai
Epicure on 45, Radisson Hotel Shanghai New World, Shanghai
Oriental Pearl Revolving Restaurant, Oriental Pearl Tower, Shanghai

Suzhou
Revolving Restaurant, Aster Hotel, Suzhou

Tianjin
Revolving Restaurant, Tianjin Radio and Television Tower, Tianjin (closed, now a revolving library)

Wenzhou
Revolving Restaurant, Wenzhou International Hotel, Wenzhou

Wuhan
Panorama Restaurant, Holiday Inn Wuhan-Riverside, Wuhan

Colombia
El Giratorio Restaurant, Hotel Dann Carlton, Barranquilla
Restaurante La Fragata Giratorio, World Trade Center, Bogotá
Tony Roma's, Hotel Dann Carlton, Medellín

Croatia
Vertigo bar, Hotel Antunović, Zagreb

Egypt
360-The Revolving Restaurant, Cairo Tower, Cairo
The Revolving Restaurant, Grand Hyatt Cairo

Finland
Näsinneula tower, Tampere
Puijo tower, Kuopio

France
 Phare de la Méditerranée, Palavas-les-Flots, Hérault
 Tour de l'Europe (Mulhouse), Mulhouse, Alsace

Germany
360° Drehrestaurant im Wildpark Hotel, Bad Marienberg
Europaturm, Frankfurt am Main (closed since 1999)
Panoramabar im Vital Hotel der Rhein-Main-Therme, Hofheim
Fernmeldeturm, Mannheim
Fernmeldeturm, Nürnberg (closed since 1991)
Florianturm, Dortmund (oldest revolving restaurant in the world; closed to general public since 2015, now only available for private event bookings)
Heinrich-Hertz-Turm, Hamburg (closed since 2001)
Henninger Turm, Frankfurt am Main (two revolving restaurants, closed in 2002 and tower since demolished)
Hotel Steinwaldhaus, Drehlokal, Erbendorf
Olympiaturm, Munich (at Olympic Park)
Rheinturm, Düsseldorf
Telecafé, Berliner Fernsehturm, Berlin
Water Tower Belvedere, Aachen

Greece
OTE Tower, Thessaloniki

Guatemala
El Giratorio de Vista Quince, Guatemala City

Hong Kong
26/F, Wu Sang House, Mong Kok, Kowloon (1966-1996)
Furama Kempinski, Furama Hong Kong Hotel, Central, Hong Kong (building demolished in December 2001)
R66 Revolving Restaurant, Hopewell Centre, Wan Chai, Hong Kong (closed in December 2011)
The Grand Buffet, Level 62, Hopewell Centre, Wan Chai, Hong Kong

Iceland
Perlan, Reykjavík

India
Stellar - The Revolving Restaurant, Hotel Drona Palace, Kashipur,Uttarakhand.

360 Degree Revolving Restaurant, Pune, Maharashtra
4X International, Ludhiana
Pind Balluchi 18th Floor, Biscomaun Tower, Patna, Bihar
Aasma Restaurant, Panchkula, Haryana
Ansal Plaza, Sonepat, Haryana
Carnival Heights, Chennai
Chicago Revolving Restaurant, Ernakulam
Falak, Hotel K.C Residency, Jammu city
Kandeel, Tex Palazzo Hotel, Surat (Asia's first revolving hotel)
Kashish Restaurant, Sirsa District
Om Revolving Restaurant, Jaipur
Parikrama, New Delhi
 Patang Hotel – located in Ahmedabad, Gujarat, India
Patel Revolving Restaurant, Siwan District
The Pearl of the Orient, Ambassador Hotel, Mumbai, Maharashtra
Revolving Restaurant, Hotel Howard International, Mussoorie
Sahib Revolving Restaurant, Ludhiana
UFO Revolving restaurant Mumbai, Maharashtra
 Cloud 7 Revolving restaurant, RS Sarovar Portico Palampur,Himachal Pradesh.

Indonesia
Panyawangan Restaurant, Hotel Panghegar, Bandung
 A new revolving restaurant will open soon  at Westin Jakarta, replacing Empire Grill Menara Kuningan, which closed in 2010.

Iran
Abadgaran Hotel, Mashhad
Aseman Hotel, Isfahan
Bolour Tower, Tabriz
Borj-e Sefid (the White Tower), Tehran
Cheshm andaz tower, Ramsar, Mazandaran
El Goli Hotel, Tabriz
Enghelab Hotel, Tehran
Eram Grand Hotel, Kish Island
Mahestan Shopping center, Karaj
Milad Tower (Borj-e Milad), Tehran
Moali Abad, Shiraz
Mosala, Isfahan
Narmafzar Tower, Emperor Restaurant, Ahwaz
Narnjestan Hotel, Noor
Revolving Restaurant, Grand Hotel Shiraz
Saeedi Center, Qom
Yademen Tower, Gorgan
Borj-e Sefid (the White Tower), Urmia
Gandomak, Urmia

Iraq
Baghdad Tower
Grand Millennium Hotel, Sulaimani

Japan
Fukunoseki restaurant, Shimonoseki (Hinoyama Summit)
Ginza Sky Lounge in Yūrakuchō, Tokyo (rotates counterclockwise, unlike most revolving restaurants)
Hanagasa Revolving Sky Restaurant, Okinawa Miyako Hotel, Naha, Okinawa
Hotel New Tsukamoto, Chiba
Restaurant Rondo, Century Royal Hotel, Sapporo
THE Sky, Hotel New Otani, Tokyo (restaurant open, but not currently rotating)
Top of Kyoto, Rihga Royal Hotel, Kyoto
Le Train Blue Restaurant on top of Hiroshima Kokusai Hotel, Hiroshima

Kazakhstan
Soluxe Hotel Astana, Nur-Sultan

Kenya
Kenyatta International Conference Centre, located on the 28th floor of the KICC Tower, in the Central Business District of Kenya's Capital city, Nairobi
360 Grills & Lounges - Valley View Office Park City Park Drive Rooftop, Tower 'B'

Kuwait
Kuwait Towers, Kuwait City
Liberation Tower, Kuwait City

Lebanon
Monte Alberto Hotel and Restaurant, Zahle

Libya
Al Mat'am al-Hawar Burj al-Fateh, Tripoli

Lithuania
Paukščių takas, Vilnius TV Tower, Vilnius

Macau
360° Café, Macau Tower, Macau
Rotunda Revolving Restaurant, Metro Park Hotel, Macau

Malaysia
@mosphere, Kota Kinabalu
Bayview Hotel, George Town, Penang
Bintang Restaurant (not revolving 2019), The Federal Kuala Lumpur
Menara Alor Setar, Alor Setar
Menara Kuala Lumpur, Kuala Lumpur

Mexico
Bellini Restaurante, World Trade Center Mexico City

Nepal
 Revolving Restauant, Airport Hotel, Sinamangal, Kathmandu
 Revolving Restaurant, Ratna Plaza, Dharmapath, New road, Kathmandu

The Netherlands

De Koperen Hoogte, De Lichtmis, near Zwolle (reconstructed water tower)
Moon, Adam tower, Amsterdam
UFO, Rotterdam

New Caledonia
 Le 360°, Ramada Plaza, Nouméa

New Zealand
Orbit, Sky Tower, Auckland

North Korea
Hyangsan Hotel, Myohyang-san
Koryo Hotel, Pyongyang; two revolving restaurants, but only one in operation
Ryanggang Hotel, Pyongyang
Ryugyong Hotel, Pyongyang; five revolving restaurant levels, none of which have yet opened
Yanggakdo International Hotel, Pyongyang

Norway
Egon Tårnet, Tyholttårnet, Trondheim

Pakistan
KHIVA Revolving Restaurant, Islamabad
Port Tower Complex, Karachi
The Revolving Restaurant, Karachi

Philippines
100 Revolving Restaurant, Quezon City
Pasig Revolving Tower, Pasig

Portugal
Vasco da Gama Tower - closed October 2004

Qatar
Aspire Tower, Doha

Russia
Seventh Heaven, Ostankino Tower, Moscow was highest in 1967-75

Saudi Arabia
Al Faisaliyah Center

Serbia
Grand Hotel Tornik-Sky Revolving restaurant, Zlatibor
Genex Tower, Belgrade

Singapore

Meritus Mandarin Singapore (not currently revolving)
Prima Tower Revolving Restaurant, Prima Tower (closed since 6 April 2020)
Tong Le Dining, Collyer Quay

Slovakia
VEŽA, Kamzík TV Tower, Bratislava

South Africa
Revolving Restaurant, CR Swart Building, Bloemfontein (closed for maintenance for five years already)
Roma Revolving Restaurant, Durban

South Korea
N Seoul Tower

Spain
Panoramic 360, Forum Building Granada - Permanently Closed

Switzerland
Hoher Kasten
Le Kuklos, Leysin
Mittelallalin, above Saas-Fee (world's highest)
Piz Gloria, on the summit of Schilthorn, near Mürren
Stanserhorn

Syria
Cham Palace Hotel, Damascus

Taiwan
Star Tower Restaurant, Taipei
UFO Revolving Restaurant, Taichung

Tanzania
Akemi Restaurant, Golden Jubilee PSPF Towers, Dar es Salaam
Mapinduzi Revolving Restaurant, Mapinduzi Square, Muembe Kiosonge, Zanzibar City

Thailand
Club Lounge, Grand China Princess Hotel, Bangkok
Pattaya Park Beach hotel, Pattaya
Phu Jaya Mini Resort & Restaurant, Chiang Mai

Trinidad and Tobago
360 Revolving Restaurant, Radisson Hotel Trinidad, Port of Spain

Turkey
Atakule Tower, Ankara
Endem TV Tower, Istanbul

Uganda
7 Hills Revolving Restaurant, Golf Course Hotel, Kampala

United Arab Emirates
Al Dawaar, Hyatt Regency, Dubai
Al Fanar, Le Royal Meridien, Abu Dhabi
Tiara, Marina Mall, Abu Dhabi

United Kingdom
Butlins Top of the Tower Restaurant, BT Tower, London (closed in 1980)
Lakeview Restaurant, Center Parcs Elveden Forest (closed in November 2016)
St. John's Beacon, Liverpool (closed in 1977, now a radio station, no longer revolves)

There are now no remaining functional revolving restaurants in the UK.

United States
Alabama
 The Marriott Shoals Hotel & Spa, Florence

Arizona
 Compass Restaurant, Hyatt Regency Phoenix, Phoenix

California
 BonaVista Lounge, Westin Bonaventure Hotel, Los Angeles (LA Prime Restaurant directly above does not rotate)

Florida
 Garden Grill, Epcot, Walt Disney World Resort, Lake Buena Vista
 Grand Plaza Hotel & Resort, Spinners overlooking the Gulf of Mexico, St. Pete Beach, Florida 
 The View at CK's at Marriott, Tampa International Airport, Tampa, Florida (closed)

Georgia
 Polaris, Hyatt Regency Atlanta, Atlanta
 Sun Dial, Westin Peachtree Plaza Hotel, Atlanta (no longer revolves after 2017 accident)

Hawaii
 La Ronde, Ala Moana Center, Honolulu (closed), designed by John Graham & Company; built in 1963; the first revolving restaurant in the United States, preceding the SkyCity "Eye of the Needle" atop the Space Needle in Seattle (also designed by John Graham)
 Top of Waikiki, Honolulu

Illinois
 Ventana's, Rosemont (closed to the public; only open for receptions, parties)

Indiana
 Eagle's Nest, Hyatt Regency Indianapolis, Indianapolis

Iowa
 Top of the Tower Ballroom, Holiday Inn Downtown, Des Moines (closed in 1988)

Kentucky
 Eighteen, Radisson Hotel Cincinnati Waterfront, Covington
 Galt House, Louisville (dual revolving floorplates)
 Spire, Hyatt Regency Louisville, Louisville (only used for special events/receptions since 2007, not open to the public)

Massachusetts
 Spinnaker, Hyatt Regency, Cambridge, Massachusetts (closed in 2004)

Michigan
 Formerly Coach Insignia, General Motors Renaissance Center, Detroit, Michigan (Closed)

Minnesota
 Apostle Supper Club, Radisson Hotel Duluth Harborview, Duluth

Missouri
 Skies Restaurant & Lounge, Hyatt Regency Crown Center, Kansas City (closed December 1, 2011 when Sheraton Hotels took over the Hyatt)
 Top of the Riverfront, Millennium Hotel, St. Louis (temporary closing as of January 2014)

Nevada
 Top of the World, Stratosphere, Las Vegas

New York
 Changing Scene, First Federal Plaza, Rochester (closed)
 The View, New York Marriott Marquis, New York City

Oklahoma 
 3sixty Restaurant & Bar, Oklahoma City (Closed)

Ohio
 Ventana's, Millennium Hotel, Cincinnati (no longer open to the public; calls itself a "revolving reception venue")

South Carolina
 Top of Carolina, University of South Carolina, Columbia; only open for Friday lunch and Sunday brunch during university's calendar year

Tennessee
 Pinnacle Restaurant, Downtown Sheraton Hotel, Nashville (closed 2000)
 Top of the 100, 100 North Main, Memphis (might open)

Texas
 Antares, Reunion Tower, Dallas (a major remodel took more than a year; renamed Five Sixty in 2009 when opened again by Wolfgang Puck, Closed)
 Cloud Nine Cafe, Reunion Tower, Dallas (Closed)
 Marriott Hotel, George Bush Intercontinental Airport, Houston (closed in 2014)
 Spindletop, Hyatt Regency Hotel, Houston (Closed)
 Tower of the Americas, San Antonio

Virginia
 Skydome Lounge, Doubletree Hotel Crystal City at National Airport, Arlington

Washington
 SkyCity, Space Needle, Seattle, designed by John Graham & Company based on lessons from their previous design of La Ronde in Hawai'i (closed 2017)
 What was once the SkyCity restaurant has now been gutted and changed to the Loupe Lounge, a 21+ bar at the top of the Space Needle which opened 2021.

 Wisconsin
 Polaris, Hyatt Regency Milwaukee opened in 1980 and took its last spin in 2009. It was closed for private events only but reopened in 2015, only it no longer spins.

Uruguay
La Vista, in Punta del Este (open for lunch and dinner)

Uzbekistan
 Koinot, Tashkent Tower, Tashkent

Venezuela
 Hotel El Paseo, Restaurante El Girasol, Maracaibo, Zulia
 Hotel Pipo Internacional, Maracay, Aragua

See also
 Lists of restaurants

References

Entertainment lists

Lists of buildings and structures
Lists of restaurants